Tony Klinger (born 29 January 1950) is a British film-maker, author and media executive. He began his career as Assistant Director on The Avengers in the 1960s, directed several rockumentaries and headed media companies both in the UK and the USA.

Klinger is the son of film producer Michael Klinger, with whom he worked on the film Get Carter (1971) starring Michael Caine.

Early life and education 
Born in Hackney Salvation Army Hospital, Klinger decided at the age of nine, that he wanted to be a film-maker. Whilst at school, Klinger won prizes from sponsored writing competitions and, together with some pals, ran an underground school magazine called Fanfare at his secondary school, Harrow High. By the age of 18, Klinger was already both developing scripts and producing small professional films.

Career

2021 Klinger is presenting, co-producing and co-directing "Dirty, Sexy and Totally Iconic" celebrating the 50th anniversary of his father's film, "Get Carter.". He is working with Rob Fairhurst, Wayne Roberts and the team at AR Media in Northampton. He is also a founding partner in the new vintage radio station, "Classic Drama Radio" www.classicdramaradio.co.uk - Klinger, with colleagues Sen Monro and Paul Greenwood, recently formed Gripping Yarns Films Ltd. to produce films "Sweet Dreams", "Deepak Calhoun" and "Crooners".

2022 will see his new novel, "Alsatia- The Search for Treasure" and his reference book, "How to Get Your Movie Made by Someone Who Knows" will be published.   
In 2020 www.gonzopublishers.com  published the second editions of "The Butterfly Boy" and "The Who and I", which was formerly entitled "Twilight of the Gods" while also being the home for his other novel, "Under God's Table". For further information about Tony's work both present and future his agent is Evelynne Ralph-Larner  M: +44(0)7752 608691 e-mail eve@esrlag.com www.esrlag.com

During 2019 Tony produced and directed the documentary film, "Solo2Darwin"  with Paul Martin and also served as Executive Producer on another feature-length documentary "Sisters". and he launched Tony Klinger Coaching. www.tonyklingercoaching.com

Tony Klinger was awarded The Lifetime Achievement Award at the Romford Film Festival on 28 May 2018. His film about his late father, "The Man Who Got Carter" is to premiere on 3 November. 2018.

Tony Klinger is now also a public speaker giving talks, speeches or lectures on a variety of themes.

Klinger launched his new company "GGG" a film making fun opportunity for all sections of society who want a quick film making opportunity and "Give-Get-Go" a Community Outreach Project  to facilitate training, education and fun for all sections of society who want to have film making experiences of every type.

Klinger's novel, "Under God's Table" was published in May 2017. His play, "A Tired Heart & The Big C" premiered in 2015 

He has worked in a variety of media roles, including diverse positions in television as an Assistant Director, and then editor, straight through to increasingly senior production roles on action-adventure films such as Gold (1974) and Shout at the Devil (1976). Klinger also made rock films, documenting Deep Purple "Deep Purple Riser Over Japan" and "The Butterfly Ball" and The Who, including The Kids Are Alright (1979). Klinger's book, Twilight of the Gods, recalling the making of the film The Kids Are Alright, was published in 2009–10. Klinger was appointed Chief Judge for the H.E. Bates Short Story Competition for 2017–2018.

In 2010, Klinger launched bCreative, a social networking website for those who wish to work in the creative arts.

2008 saw Klinger premiere his film Full Circle.

Until the end of 2006, Klinger was Chief Executive of production-company, agency, and content creators, TLMH.

Klinger has also served as a lecturer for their undergraduate programmes and Course Director for the Kickstart course which he had created and was Course Leader for the MA Film Production and BA Foundation Degree courses at the Northern Film Schools, and was The Director of the Media Production Centre at the University of East London.

In 2012 Klinger directed music videos for Honest John Plain featuring The Pretenders, Hanoi Rocks and Mott the Hoople amongst others. He also shot all the material for the upcoming psychic stars, Hide & Peel who are soon to hit the circuit in both the United States and UK. Completing his novels Noah's Table and The Butterfly Boy. His documentary film, Mister Producer about his late father, Michael Klinger was screened in 2011.

Klinger has served on international boards, such as his tenure as National Secretary of The Association of Media Practice Educators (AMPE) and The Audition for Hollywood Company. He has also run Film Production courses at the UK's renowned Bournemouth Film School and Northern Film Schools and was Director of the Media Production Centre at the University of East London. He co-founded the Screen Commission Northants and served as Patron of The UK Film School Charity and the NEL Creative and Cultural Strategy Board for where he represented the Digital and Creative Sectors.

Klinger founded www.give-get-go.com in 2016.

Klinger went on to serve as company President or Chief Executive for several media production, sales and distribution companies both in the UK and USA, including Avton Communications & Entertainment Inc., Small Giant Media Ltd. and Production TLMH Ltd.

Publications
2020 
The Butterfly Boy (second edition including new material)

Media

References

External links
 
 Official website

British film directors
21st-century British novelists
Living people
1950 births
British male novelists
21st-century British male writers
Academics of Arts University Bournemouth